Autopista TF-5 is a motorway in the Canary Islands, in the north of Tenerife, running from Santa Cruz de Tenerife to Puerto de la Cruz. Most of the motorway is a Controlled-access highway or expressway, with some single carriageway remaining west of Puerto de la Cruz.

TF-5 begins in Santa Cruz de Tenerife with westbound traffic merging off from Av Tres de Mayor and ends with the motorway splitting between TF42 Motorway and TF82 Motorway in Puerto de la Cruz.

At present, it is the motorway that supports the highest traffic density in the Canary Islands, with stretches in which around 100,000 cars per day circulate.

Exits

From Santa Cruz de Tenerife to Los Realejos TF5 has numbered exits.

References

TF-5
TF-5